Bišče is a settlement on the right bank of the Kamnik Bistrica River in the Municipality of Domžale in the Upper Carniola region of Slovenia.

Name
Bišče was attested in written sources as Wittschicz in 1439 and Wischicz in 1444, among other spellings.

References

External links 

Bišče on Geopedia

Populated places in the Municipality of Domžale